Dasari Sudha is an Indian politician and member of the Andhra Pradesh Legislative Assembly from Badvel. Sudha is member of the YSR Congress Party. She won 2021 elections by elections for Badvel after her husband Gunthoti Venkata Subbaiah died of ill-health in 2021.

References 

YSR Congress Party politicians
Living people
People from Kadapa district
Andhra Pradesh MLAs 2019–2024
Year of birth missing (living people)